Before the independence of South Sudan from Sudan, the 10 states of Southern Sudan were divided into districts. These districts have been superseded by counties.

Central Equatoria

 Terkaka District
 Juba District
 Yei District
 Kajo Kaii District

East Equatoria

 Magwi District
 Amatonge District
 Shokodom District
 Kapoeta District

Jonglei

 Uror District
 Fam al Zaraf District
 Ayod District
 Wat District
 Akobo District
 Twi/Twic East & Duk Districts
 Bor District
 Pibor District

Lakes

 Shobet District
 Rumbek District
 Yerol District
 Aliab District

North Bahr al Ghazal

 Aryat District
 Aweil District
 Wanyjok District
 Malek Alel District

Unity

 Al Mayom District
 Rabkona District
 Faring District
 Al Leiri District

Upper Nile

 Tonga District
 Fashooda District
 Malut District
 Al Renk District
 Al Mabien District
 Mayot District
 Sobat District
 Baleit District

Warab

 Nahr Lol District
 Gogrial District
 Warab District
 Tonj District

West Bahr al Ghazal

 Raja District
 Wau District
 Nahr Jur District

West Equatoria

 Tombura District
 Yambio District
 Meridi District
 Mundri District

See also 
States of South Sudan
Districts of Sudan

External links 

 
Subdivisions of South Sudan
South Sudan, Districts
Sudan 2
Districts, Sudan
Sudan geography-related lists